Køge Bugt-banen is one of six radial S-train lines in Copenhagen; it connects the city center to communities along Køge Bugt (the bay of Køge) and terminates in the city of Køge about 35 km southwest of central Copenhagen.

Stations

Service patterns 

The basic service pattern consists of the A service which runs until Hundige and stops at all stations, and E, which runs partially non-stop until Ishøj and then stops at all stations until Køge.

History 

Køge Bugt-banen is the only one of the six S-train radials that was originally built as an S-train line. It opened in four phases between 1972 and 1983. It was originally envisaged that its main role would be as a "picnic railway" providing access for city-dwellers to the beaches between Brøndby Strand and Hundige, but after the first phase was completed it became evident that transporting commuters were more important. Therefore, the station at Hundige was placed about 500 m farther inland than planned at first. Around 1960 the area was sparsely populated, but there were large housing projects in the 1960s–1970s. City suburbs need transportation, which is the background of the railway project. The abandoned area reservations from Ishøj until Olsbækken in Greve can still be followed on a modern map.

The railway was completed when it reached Køge in 1983. Until then the only rail connection between Copenhagen and Køge was a long detour via Roskilde.

Future 
A new high-speed railway, Copenhagen–Ringsted Line, has been built parallel with Køgebugtbanen continuing to Ringsted, opened for traffic in 2019. This line has a stop at a new station, located between Ølby and Jersie Station, which serves as an exchange point between the new line and Køge Bugt-banen. The new station is called Køge Nord Station.

References 

S-train (Copenhagen) lines